François Jauffret (born 9 February 1942) is a retired professional tennis player from France. He holds the record for most ties played for the France Davis Cup team with 35, between 1964 and 1978.

Jauffret twice reached the semi-finals at the Roland Garros, in 1966 (beating Roy Emerson before losing to Tony Roche) and 1974 (beating Jan Kodes before losing to Manuel Orantes). He won two Open era singles titles (in 1969 in Buenos Aires and in 1977 in Cairo) and seven doubles titles on the ATP Tour in his career. His career-high ATP singles ranking was world No. 20.

He is the brother of tennis player Pierre Jauffret.

Career finals

Singles (2 titles, 3 runner-ups)

Doubles (8 titles, 6 runner-ups)

External links
 
 
 

1942 births
French male tennis players
Universiade medalists in tennis
Living people
Tennis players from Bordeaux
Universiade gold medalists for France
Universiade bronze medalists for France
Medalists at the 1959 Summer Universiade